Bivand-e Sofla (also Romanized as Bīvand-e Soflá) is a village in Sharwineh Rural District, Kalashi District, Javanrud County, Kermanshah Province, Iran. At the 2006 census, its population was 524, in 120 families.

References 

Populated places in Javanrud County